The List of shipwrecks in 1767 includes some ships sunk, wrecked or otherwise lost during 1767.

January

2 January

3 January

4 January

8 January

12 January

13 January

16 January

31 January

Unknown date

February

19 February

21 February

26 February

27 February

Unknown date

March

21 March

28 March

Unknown date

April

24 April

Unknown date

May

27 May

Unknown date

June

2 June

Unknown date

July

17 July

22 July

24 July

27 July

Unknown date

August

1 August

7 August

23 August

28 August

Unknown date

September

1 September

15 September

Unknown date

October

1 October

6 October

8 October

13 October

26 October

Unknown date

November

11 November

12 November

17 November

19 November

Unknown date

December

1 December

3 December

4 December

10 December

16 December

19 December

27 December

30 December

Unknown date

Unknown date

References

1767